Liskeard Rural District was a local government division of Cornwall in England, UK, between 1894 and 1974. Established under the Local Government Act 1894, the rural district was enlarged in 1934 by the abolition of Bodmin Rural District, as well as undergoing a few boundary changes with other adjacent districts.

In 1974 the district was abolished under the Local Government Act 1972, forming part of the new Caradon district.

Civil parishes
The civil parishes within the district were:

 Boconnoc
 Dobwalls and Trewidland
 Duloe
 Lanreath
 Lansallos
 Lanteglos
 Linkinhorne
 Menheniot
 Morval
 Pelynt
 South Hill
 St Cleer
 St Ive
 St Keyne
 St Martin by Looe
 St Neot
 St Pinnock
 St Veep
 St Winnow
 Warleggan

References

Districts of England created by the Local Government Act 1894
Districts of England abolished by the Local Government Act 1972
Rural districts of England
Local government in Cornwall
History of Cornwall